Oswald Karch (6 March 1917 – 28 January 2009) was a racing driver from Germany. He participated in one World Championship Formula One Grand Prix, the 1953 German Grand Prix.  He retired from the race, scoring no championship points.

Complete Formula One World Championship results 
(key)

References 

German racing drivers
German Formula One drivers
1917 births
2009 deaths
Sportspeople from Ludwigshafen
Racing drivers from Rhineland-Palatinate
People from the Palatinate (region)